LiquidPiston is the developer and manufacturer of a pistonless rotary engine called the X-engine, located in Bloomfield, Connecticut.

X-engine 
This is essentially an inverted Wankel engine that operates on the high-efficiency hybrid cycle. 
In the Wankel, the only successful pistonless rotary engine to date, an oval-like epitrochoid housing surrounds a curved sided triangular rotor. The rotor revolves around the central output shaft in a wobbling hula-hoop motion. The rotor pushes the output shaft via toothed gears.  One power pulse is delivered in one revolution of the output shaft. The output shaft revolved at three times the speed of the rotor. For comparison a four-stroke piston engine delivers one power pulse for two rotations of the output shaft.  The three operating chambers of the Wankel formed by the triangular rotor are separated by seals installed on the three apexes of the rotor. These seals move in and out during each hula-hoop rotation of the rotor, being subjected to high stresses and wear. As a result they have been a limiting factor in durability of such engines.

The LiquidPiston design reverses the shapes: an oval rotor moves within a triangular housing. The required seals (both face and apex) are mounted on the stationary housing, and are lubricated directly.
This cycle consists of compressing air (with no fuel) to a very high ratio, as is typical in the Diesel cycle. The air is then isolated in a constant volume chamber. Fuel is directly injected being allowed to combust fully under constant volume conditions, which is how Otto cycle combustion is modelled. Finally, the combustion products are expanded to atmospheric pressure, utilizing the Atkinson cycle.

The rotor has passages to supply air and remove exhaust gas, thereby eliminating the need for valves.

In order to use the Diesel cycle efficiently, high compression ratios are required. Typical piston diesel engines use between 15:1 and 24:1. The LiquidPiston engine was demonstrated on the Diesel cycle with compression ratio as high as 26:1. This would generally rule out the use of low octane fuels like gasoline, so there is also a lower compression spark ignited version called the X-Mini. The X-Mini is a 70 cc air-cooled naturally aspirated four-stroke X-Engine variant, that has been operated on a variety of fuels using spark ignition including gasoline, kerosene, jet fuels including Jet A, as well as propane and hydrogen .

References

External links
 
 LiquidPiston, Inc. official site

Proposed engines

Pistonless rotary engine
Emerging technologies